Huila may refer to:

Places
 Huila Department, in Colombia
 Huíla Province, in Angola
 Nevado del Huila, (Mount Huila) volcano in Colombia
 Huila River, stream in Sangre Grande, Trinidad and Tobago
 Huila, Pichincha, populated place in Pichincha Province, Ecuador
 Huila, La Paz, populated place in La Paz Department (Bolivia)
 Huila, Cauca, populated place in Cauca Department, Colombia
 Huila, Junín, populated place in Junín Region, Peru

Other
 Atlético Huila, a first division association football team in Colombia